Zoë Straub (born 1 December 1996), known professionally as Zoë, stylized as ZOË, is an Austrian singer, songwriter and actress. She represented Austria with the song "Loin d'ici" in the Eurovision Song Contest 2016 and placed thirteenth in the grand final.

Life and career

1996–2014: Early life 
Zoë Straub was born in the Austrian capital, Vienna, to musician parents, Christof Straub and Roumina Straub (born Wilfling), on 1 December 1996.

At the age of six, she featured in a song by her parents' musical project, Papermoon, called "Doop Doop (Baby Remix)". In 2007, Straub participated in the Austrian reality singing competition Kiddy Contest, where she covered "Engel ohne Flügel", originally performed by Mark Medlock, a German singer, while she was attending Lycée Français de Vienne (French High School of Vienna), where she studied for nine years.

2015–2018: Career beginnings, Debut and Eurovision Song Contest 

Straub appeared on ORF television series Vorstadtweiber in 2015. She also competed in the Austrian national final for the Eurovision Song Contest 2015, where she eventually placed third with the song "Quel filou", written by Straub herself and her father, Christof Straub. She performed live at Rathausplatz while Vienna was serving as the host city of Eurovision Song Contest 2015. In October 2015, she released her début album Debut.

On 12 January 2016, she was announced as one of the participants of the Austrian national final for the Eurovision Song Contest 2016, and on 12 February 2016, she emerged as the winner of the national final and therefore represented Austria in the Eurovision Song Contest 2016 with the song "Loin d'ici" in Stockholm, Sweden; qualified for the grand final where she placed 13th in total and 8th in televoting. On 29 April 2016, she released a reissued version of Debut. In Eurovision 2017 she was a member of the Austrian jury for Semi-final 2 and for the Grand Final. In December 2017, it was announced that she would serve as a judge in the Sammarinese national selection event for the Eurovision Song Contest 2018 a national final event she and her family funded,
alongside Neon Hitch and Vince Bugg.

2018-present: Gold status, No.1 in Italy, Tout Paris, Acting career 
The last few years the singer and actress has been musically very active. She released her first album “Debut”, which very quickly achieved gold status, after which she toured Austria and Europe. Her single “C’est la Vie” was No.1 in Italy for many months, and also became a big radio hit in some European countries.

ZOË also started her career as an actress: in addition to several series and film appearances, she appeared in the first German Netflix production "Isi und Ossi", as well as the most successful Austrian series of the last 10 years "Vorstadtweiber", among others.

After her last single releases "Tout Paris" and "Rêverie", she released the song "Loin d'ici (far from here)": a new, modern and up-to-date version of the 2016 ESC hit "Loin d'ici", this time with the support of newcomer Leonardo Davi, who enriches the song with English verses.

Personal life 
She lives in Vienna with her fiancé Kaspar Leuhusen, whom she met in 2010. On 4 February 2020, she gave birth to her son Viktor. Zoë and Kaspar got married August 3, 2022.

Discography
Her debut studio album, simply titled "Debut," was released on 23 October 2015 under the label Global Rockstar Music. The album reached #5 on the Austrian album charts and was certified Gold by IFPI AUT.

Zoe has released several successful singles throughout her career, starting with "Quel filou" in 2015, which reached #23 on the Austrian charts. The same year, she released "Je m'en fous" and "Mon cœur a trop aimé." In 2016, Zoe released "Loin d'ici," which peaked at #13 on the Austrian charts and #66 on the Swedish charts. She also released "La nuit des merveilles" as a non-album single that year.

In 2017, Zoe released "Dangerous Affair," followed by "C'est La Vie" in 2018. In 2019, she released "C'est La Vie (Remixes)," "Amour Fou," and "Amour Fou the Remixes" as an EP. She released "Tout Paris" in 2020, followed by "Nacht," "Tout Paris (Laibert Remix)," and "Rêverie" in 2021.

Zoe's most recent single is "Loin d'ici (far from here)," which was released in 2022.

Zoe's discography is a testament to her talent and creativity as a musician. Her music has gained recognition in Austria and beyond, showcasing her ability to create a unique sound that resonates with audiences. With a growing fan base and a promising career ahead of her, Zoe Straub is definitely an artist to watch in the Austrian music scene.

Studio albums

Singles

Filmography 
Zoe Straub has an impressive filmography that includes roles in several movies and TV shows. She made her debut in the television series "Vorstadtweiber" in 2015, where she played the role of Laura in four episodes of the first season. The same year, she appeared in the mini-series "Pregau" as Rosa. In 2016, Zoe played the character of Silke Lehmann in an episode of the long-running Austrian crime series "SOKO Kitzbühel." She also made a guest appearance in the sixth season of "Schnell ermittelt," where she portrayed Lia Pollak in one episode. In 2018, She appeared in the comedy series "Wischen ist Mach," followed by a role in the crime drama series "Meiberger - Im Kopf des Täters" in 2019. She then returned to the crime genre in 2021, with a guest role in an episode of "Soko Donau/ Wien."

Zoe's film career began in 2020 with her role as Camilla in the romantic comedy "Isi & Ossi." The same year, she also appeared in the documentary "Habsburgs Coupled Daughters," where she played the role of Leopoldina. In 2021, She starred in the short film "Der weiße Kobold" before her most recent role as Blanka in the 2022 film "Filip." 

Zoe's filmography showcases her versatility as an actress and her ability to take on different roles in various genres. She has demonstrated her range and talent in both movies and TV shows, making her a rising star in the Austrian entertainment industry.

Television

Film

Awards and nominations
Zoe has been recognized for her contributions to the Austrian music scene through award nominations. In 2016, she was nominated for two Amadeus Austrian Music Awards: Female Artist of the Year and Song of the Year for "Mon cœur a trop aimé." Although she did not win either award, her nominations reflected her growing success as a singer-songwriter.

As her career continues to flourish and her fan base grows, it is likely that Zoe will receive further recognition for her music in the future. With her unique sound and impressive musical abilities, she has established herself as an artist to watch in the Austrian music industry.

References

External links 

 

1996 births
Living people
Musicians from Vienna
Austrian pop musicians
French-language singers
21st-century Austrian women singers
21st-century Austrian actresses
Eurovision Song Contest entrants for Austria
Eurovision Song Contest entrants of 2016
ORF (broadcaster) people
Actresses from Vienna
Austrian singer-songwriters
Women singer-songwriters
Austrian television actresses